The Delegation of the European Union to Armenia is the diplomatic mission of the European Union in Armenia. Its headquarters are located in Armenia's capital, Yerevan.

History 
The Delegation of the European Union to Armenia was established on 21 February 2012 to facilitate Armenia–European Union relations and officially represents the EU in Armenia. Since 17 September 2019, the Ambassador of the Delegation of the EU to Armenia is Andrea Wiktorin.

Functions 
The EU Delegation is responsible for further developing relations between the EU and Armenia, including in the areas of trade, economic, and political relations. The Delegation seeks to promote core EU values of human rights, the rule of law and democracy in Armenia, while also building networks and partnerships and supporting civil society. In addition, the Delegation is tasked with monitoring and ensuring the implementation of the Armenia-EU Comprehensive and Enhanced Partnership Agreement. 

The Delegation organizes meetings between representatives of the Government of Armenia with high-ranking EU officials, including leaders from the European Council and European Commission. 

The Delegation supported the establishment of the European Business Association in Armenia.

The Delegation plans and hosts various Europe Day activities throughout Armenia annually. The Delegation supports local charities and NGO's such as the Armenia Tree Project. The Delegation also organizes youth, educational, and cultural events, business forums, and hosts information seminars to students interested in the Erasmus Programme and Horizon Europe. In 2014, the Delegation assisted AEGEE Yerevan plan a model EU student conference.

Ambassadors 
EU Ambassadors to Armenia:
  Traian Hristea (2011–2015)
   Piotr Świtalski (2015–2019)
  Andrea Wiktorin (2019–present)

See also 
 Diplomatic missions of the European Union
 Eastern Partnership
 Euronest Parliamentary Assembly
 European Union Mission in Armenia
 European Union Monitoring Capacity to Armenia
 EU Strategy for the South Caucasus
 Foreign relations of Armenia
 Foreign relations of the European Union
 List of diplomatic missions in Armenia
 Mission of Armenia to the European Union
 Potential enlargement of the European Union

References

External links 
 Official site
 Delegation of the European Union to Armenia on Facebook

	

Armenia–European Union relations
European Union
European Union
Diplomatic missions of the European Union
Politics of the European Union
2012 establishments in Armenia